Dahi is an Arab village in northeastern Israel. Located on Givat HaMoreh (Jebel Dahi in Arabic) overlooking Afula, it falls under the jurisdiction of Bustan al-Marj Regional Council. The village is situated at an altitude of 550 meters above sea level.

History

Dahi was named after Dahia Bin Khalifa al-Kalbei, who according to Islamic tradition, was a friend of the prophet Muhammad. Dahia, an ambassador of Muhammad, attempted to convert Byzantine emperor Heraclius to Islam. According to local tradition, Dahia was killed and buried in the site of the  village.

Ottoman era
In 1875 Victor Guérin found here a small village, consisting of fifteen "miserable" houses, surrounded by gardens and bordered by cactus hedges.

In 1882, the PEF's Survey of Western Palestine (SWP)  described  it as "a little hamlet of stone cabins, on the saddle west of the conical peak of Jebel ed Duhy. Straggling olives exist on the north and west. The water supply is from a well lower down the hill, on the north."

British Mandate era
In the  1922 census of Palestine conducted by the British authorities, Al Dahi had a population of 84, all Muslims, increasing slightly in the 1931 census to 87, still all Muslim, in a total of 16  houses.

In  the 1945 statistics the population was 110, all Muslims, while the total land area was 8,038 dunams, according to an official land and population survey. Of this, 19 dunams were for plantations and irrigable land, 
2,979  for cereals, while 10 dunams were classified as built-up areas.

State of Israel
In February 2016, Bustan al-Marj Regional Council announced that its offices would move from Afula to Ed Dahi. Council chairman Ahmed Zoabi noted "The offices are now located in one of the four villages of the council and this is important". In September 2017, the regional council completed its road-paving project.

See also
Arab localities in Israel

References

Bibliography

External links
Welcome To al-Dahi
Survey of Western Palestine, Map 9:  IAA, Wikimedia commons

Arab villages in Israel
Populated places in Northern District (Israel)